Juanita García Peraza also known as "Mita" (June 24, 1897 – February 21, 1970) was the founder of the Mita Congregation, a spin-off of the Pentecostal church with Puerto Rican origins which is described in Melton's Encyclopedia of Protestantism. Erik Camayd-Freixas, a sociologist considers this group to be a cult. The group had and still has a large following. When Peraza died, the Senate of Puerto Rico closed their offices for three days in her honor.

Early years
García Peraza was born in Hatillo, Puerto Rico, and raised by her parents, both belonging to wealthy Catholic families that had immigrated to Puerto Rico from the Canary Islands in the 1830s. Her father had previously married one of his cousins, of the prominent García family of the Arecibo, Puerto Rico, region; well-known Puerto Rican writer René Marqués García is one of her nephews. After divorcing his cousin, her father married García Peraza's mother, from another Canarian family. When her family moved to their townhouse in Arecibo, García Peraza became extremely ill. She made a promise to Mita God that if she was cured, she would always serve him.

García Peraza considered it a miracle that she was cured of her illness and she decided to keep her promise. She was one of the first Puerto Rican women to preach religion in Puerto Rico. Soon, she became a leader in the church she attended. This, however, made the majority of the male church members feel uncomfortable with her presence and they told her that she was no longer welcome there.

"Mita"

García Peraza left the Roman Catholicism and converted to the Protestant Iglesia de Dios Pentecostal M.I., and then left the church with 11 other members who followed her to start their own religion. In 1940, she and her followers founded their own church in Arecibo, and in 1947 she relocated to the current location of Hato Rey, a suburb of San Juan. They claimed that "The Holy Spirit Spirit of Life" revealed to García Peraza the new name of "Mita". They started calling themselves "Mitas" and their religion "the Mita congregation". According to the Mita faith, Mita is the new name of the Holy Ghost on earth and Mita God has chosen a successor before (Peraza) dies.

Under García Peraza's leadership, the church founded many small businesses which provided work, orientation, and help for its members. The first branch of the church outside of Puerto Rico was established in New York City. The church has expanded to Mexico, Colombia, Venezuela, Dominican Republic, Costa Rica, Panama, El Salvador, Canada, Curaçao, Ecuador and Spain.

Legacy
Juanita "Mita" García Peraza died on February 21, 1970, in San Juan, Puerto Rico. Teófilo Vargas Sein ("Aarón"), was appointed Prophet of God. Puerto Rico honored Juanita García Peraza's memory by naming an elementary school after her in San Juan.

See also

List of Puerto Ricans
History of women in Puerto Rico

References

External links
 Congregación MITA official site
 Juanita Garcia "Mita" article in El Nuevo Día newspaper
   Video of Mita preaching in 1961

1897 births
1970 deaths
People from Hatillo, Puerto Rico
Puerto Rican people of Canarian descent
Puerto Rican religious leaders
Puerto Rican Pentecostals
Deified women
Converts to evangelical Christianity from Roman Catholicism
Converts to Pentecostal denominations